The Bank of Van Diemen's Land (nicknamed 'the old bank') was Tasmania's first commercial financial institution.

History

A charter was granted by Sir Thomas Brisbane and capital was divided into shares worth 200 dollars each. Founded in 1823 prior to the use of the name Tasmania, it lasted for 68 years before becoming the first major bank failure of the 1890s depression in Australia. Although it had a reputation for reliability, during the 1880s the bank lent heavily to Tasmanians who invested heavily in silver mining ventures. When the mineral prices crashed in the 1890s the bank was unable to survive the number of defaulting loans. The bank closed in August 1891, and offered up its banking premises as a £1 lottery ticket. Following the bank's demise, a Royal Commission was established to investigate allegations of fraudulent activities.

Demolition
The headquarters of the bank stood on the corner of Collins and Elizabeth Streets in Hobart until 1958 when it was demolished. The lions that stood over the original doorway are now located at the entrance to St David's Park.

References 

History of Tasmania
Economic history of Australia
Defunct banks of Australia
1893 disestablishments in Australia
Banks established in 1823
Banks disestablished in 1893
Australian companies established in 1823
Demolished buildings and structures in Tasmania